David Crane Halsted (born 1941) is an American diplomat. He served as the United States Ambassador to Chad from 1996 to 1999.

Biography
Halsted was born in Vermont in 1941. His mother was Katharine Halsted. Halsted attended Deerfield Academy and graduated from Dartmouth College in 1963. He graduated from George Washington University in 1968 and later joined the U.S. Foreign Service. On June 11, 1996, Halsted was nominated by President Bill Clinton to be the United States Ambassador to Chad. He was confirmed on  September 12, 1996, and remained in that post until August 6, 1999.

On September 29, 1998, Halsted's mother died. Halsted also has three siblings, Margaret, Bayard and Alfred.

References

External links
 United States Department of State: Chiefs of Mission for Chad
 United States Department of State: Chad
 United States Embassy in N'Djamena

Ambassadors of the United States to Chad
1941 births
Living people
United States Foreign Service personnel